Wu-tang is a dance originating in Philadelphia before spreading throughout the city and the surrounding region. The dance is normally performed to Baltimore club music. The dance involves a jerking of the arms in an up-and-down/side-to-side motion. The movement of the arms sometimes resembles flexing. Each individual person adds their own spin to the dance, be it fancy footwork or the mimicking of gunshots.

A similar Philly dance is the "D-Mack" or "D-Mac," in which a dancer moves his arms or legs on one side of his body (often in a similar motion as the Wu-tang), and then imitates the same moves on the other side of his body. The Wu-tang dance has become very popular around the Philadelphia-New Jersey-Baltimore region, and it has been compared with the Harlem Shake of Harlem, the Bay Area's hyphy dances, Atlanta's crunk dances, Baltimore's "Rockin' Off" dance, Miami's "stickin' n rollin'", and Compton's "Krumping" or "crip-walking." South Miami also has their own version of the Philadelphia Wu Tang dance, but it consists of more rapid movements of the arm and vigorous swinging of arms in a forward motion and has more use of the legs.

The dance bears no relation to the rap-group "Wu-Tang Clan" nor does it to the style of martial arts known as Wutang, though the name of the dance itself may have been derived from either source.

Ciara can be seen doing part of the dance in her music videos for songs "Work" and "Gimmie That Bass".

The creator of the Wu-Tang was originally DJ Freaknasty.

References 

Breakdance moves
Culture of Philadelphia